Grabiny may refer to the following places:
Grabiny, Brodnica County in Kuyavian-Pomeranian Voivodeship (north-central Poland)
Grabiny, Lipno County in Kuyavian-Pomeranian Voivodeship (north-central Poland)
Grabiny, Subcarpathian Voivodeship (south-east Poland)
Grabiny, Masovian Voivodeship (east-central Poland)